Salomon Faye (born 1993 in Paris, Île-de-France) is a French-American hip hop recording artist and songwriter from New York City, New York.

Discography

Extended plays

Singles

As lead artist

As featured artist

Guest appearances

References

1993 births
Living people
Male hip hop musicians
Musicians from New York City